Serine—pyruvate aminotransferase is an enzyme that in humans is encoded by the AGXT gene.

This gene is expressed only in the liver and the encoded protein is localized mostly in the peroxisomes, where it is involved in glyoxylate detoxification. Mutations in this gene, some of which alter subcellular targeting, have been associated with type I primary hyperoxaluria.

See also
Peroxisomal disorder

References

External links
  GeneReviews/NIH/NCBI/UW entry on Primary Hyperoxaluria Type 1

Further reading